Ptochosiphla is a monotypic moth genus of the family Erebidae. Its only species, Ptochosiphla oedipus, is found in Fiji. Both the genus and the species were first described by Edward Meyrick in 1933.

References

Hypeninae
Monotypic moth genera